JHT may refer to:
 Johnson Health Tech, Taiwan
 JHT Kalajoki, a Finnish ice hockey team